The Ocean ships were a class of sixty cargo ships built in the United States by Todd Shipyards Corporation during the Second World War for the British Ministry of War Transport under contracts let by the British Purchasing Commission. Eighteen were lost to enemy action and eight to accidents; survivors were sold postwar into merchant service.

To expedite production, the type was based on an existing design, later adapted to become the Liberty ship. Yards constructed to build the Oceans went immediately into production of Liberty hulls. Before and during construction the ships are occasionally mentioned as "British Victory" or victory ships as distinct from the United States variant known as the Liberty ship.

Contract and yards
On 19 December 1940 John D. Reilly, president of Todd Shipyards Corporation, announced that contracts totaling $100,000,000 had been signed between two Todd affiliates and the British Purchasing Commission for the construction of sixty cargo ships with thirty to be built at Todd California Shipbuilding Corporation in Richmond, California and thirty at Todd-Bath Iron Shipbuilding, South Portland, Maine. The ships, each estimated at $1,600,000, were to be built in entirely new yards with initial yard construction started 20 December 1940 and yard completion planned in four months with the first keels laid two and a half months after start of the yard construction. Each yard was estimated to need 5,000 or more workers. Henry J. Kaiser, then head of Seattle-Tacoma Shipbuilding Corporation, was to become president of the Todd California entity and William S. Newell, then head of Bath Iron Works, president of the Todd-Bath Iron Shipbuilding entity.

On 14 January 1941 groundbreaking took place for the new yard on a 48-acre site at Richmond, with the keel for the first Ocean ship laid seventy-eight days later on 14 April. With a contract from the Maritime Commission for twenty-four emergency type ships of the Liberty class, Kaiser began construction of six ways at his nearby Richmond Shipbuilding Corporation yards four days later.

The sunken basins in the Maine yard were the first in the world used to mass-produce ships.

Description
The Oceans were of steel construction with a welded hull to a design by naval architects Gibbs & Cox built to British Lloyd's requirements and specifications under the inspection Lloyd's Chief Surveyor in the United States. The design was based on the British "Sunderland Tramp", which originated in 1879 and was last built 1939 by J.L. Thompson and Sons North Sands shipyard becoming the basis for the Ocean class of freighter. The 1940 contract for the Ocean type called for them to be built in United States yards.

The ships were powered by triple-expansion steam engines with cylinders of 24.5 feet × 37 inches × 70 inches bore and 48-inch stroke supplied with steam from three single-ended Scotch-type coal-fired boilers placed forward of the engine for a design speed of 11 knots. This plant is described as being a modern version of one known when they first went to sea to marine engineers age forty-five or older and was chosen for the emergency ships by both the British Purchasing Commission and the United States Maritime Commission in part due to availability of repair in almost any port and so as to not compete with the surge in orders for the more modern geared turbine systems in demand for Naval and other construction. Electrical power was to be provided by single-cylinder, vertical steam engines powering two 25 kW generators.

Emergency shipbuilding programs in Canada and the United States required over 700 standardized triple-expansion steam engines to be built in seventeen plants by a number of companies. A design of the North Eastern Marine Engineering Co., Ltd., of Wallsend-on-Tyne, England was modified and standardized for mass North American production by the General Machinery Corporation with the British Purchasing Commission placing an order for sixty of the engines to power the Ocean ships with General Machinery Corporation which went in production as its standardized design and patterns were being sent to other builders. General Machinery delivered its first engine to Todd California Shipbuilding Corporation for installation in Ocean Vanguard.

All the ships had "Ocean" names, but at the time of construction were sometimes referred to as British Victory ships as in the Berkeley Daily Gazette announcement on May 20, 1942 that "the Richmond Shipyards today are delivering a finished British victory ship—the Ocean Vengeance" or the Pacific Marine Review article in its January 1943 issue noting "there had been one delivery of a Liberty ship from a Pacific Coast shipyard and there were three shipyards building Libertys and one building Victory ships for Britain" in which there is a clear distinction between the United States' "Liberty" construction and British "Victory" construction. One of the early "classifications" of the ship type had been as a "Liberty V" design, a term not apparently later used in a professional journal's references.

History

Todd-California Shipbuilding
Thirty of the Oceans were built at Richmond, California's Yard #1 by Todd-California Shipbuilding, intended specifically to build "Ocean" ships for the British. All Oceans with name beginning with the letter "V" were built by means of electric welding at Richmond, California.

The first Ocean type vessel launched was Ocean Vanguard on 16 August 1941. The launch, about two months earlier than scheduled, was a significant event with the ship's bows decorated with flags of the two nations during which Rear Admiral Emory S. Land, Chairman of the Maritime Commission, delivering an address and his wife sponsoring the ship and Sir Arthur Salter representing the British purchaser and Henry J. Kaiser representing the builder.

Todd-Bath Iron Shipbuilding construction
Thirty of the ships were built at Todd-Bath Iron Shipbuilding, South Portland, Maine, an emergency yard built by Todd, Bath Iron Works and Kaiser shipbuilding specifically to construct the "Ocean" ships for Britain, as yard hull numbers 1–30. The first vessel from this yard was Ocean Liberty launched 20 December 1941.

The five Ocean ships launched that day were hulls 19–24: Ocean Wayfarer, Ocean Stranger, Ocean Traveller, Ocean Seaman, and Ocean Gallant, with sponsors being wives of U.S. Senators, a Todd executive and directors of the British Ministry of Shipping. The ships, launched by flooding the construction basins and towing them to the fitting out docks, were all launched within fifteen minutes. The last three of the thirty ships from the Todd yard, Ocean Crusader,
Ocean Gypsy, and Ocean Glory, were launched 18 October 1942, whereupon the basins were to be used to build additional Liberty hulls with four already under construction.

Five Ocean ships were transferred to foreign governments during the war.

Lost to enemy action
Eighteen ships were lost to enemy action during the war, although two were later salvaged and returned to service.

Eight ships were lost in accidents postwar.

The Oceans served until the mid-1980s, with  being scrapped in 1985.  was on Chinese shipping registers as Zhan Dou 26 until 1992.

Footnotes

References

Ocean (British Liberty) class merchant ships u-boat.net

External links
 Kaiser Permanente No. 1, Richmond CA (Shipbuilding History construction listing)
 New England Shipbuilding, South Portland ME (Shipbuilding History construction listing)

Ministry of War Transport ships
World War II merchant ships of the United Kingdom
Ships built in Richmond, California
Ships built in Bath, Maine